The 71st Punjabis was an infantry regiment of the British Indian Army that formed part of the Indian Army during the First World War.  Raised in July 1917, it was later absorbed into the 111th Mahars in 1919.

History

The Punjab Christian Battalion was raised on 9 July 1917 in Montgomery.  It was numbered as the 71st Punjabis in December 1917 and joined the 44th (Ferozepore) Brigade in 16th Indian Division.  It served with the brigade and division on the North West Frontier until May 1918 when it was transferred to Bushire.

In 1919 the regiment was absorbed into the 111th Mahars.

See also

 71st Coorg Rifles

References

Bibliography

External links
 

British Indian Army infantry regiments
Military units and formations established in 1917
Military units and formations disestablished in 1919